Ian Maconachie was an Irish badminton player. He represented Ireland in the national team and competed in many All England Championships with the highlight being the 1937 mixed doubles winner together with Thelma Kingsbury.

Medal Record at the All England Badminton Championships

References

Irish male badminton players